Joseph William Righetti (born December 31, 1947) is a former American football defensive tackle who played two seasons with the Cleveland Browns of the National Football League (NFL). He was drafted by the Cleveland Browns in the sixth round of the 1969 NFL Draft. He played college football at Waynesburg University and attended Bethlehem-Center High School in Fredericktown, Pennsylvania.

Early years
Righetti played high school football at Bethlehem-Center High School. He was named most valuable lineman in his senior year.

College career
Righetti was a four-year starter for the Waynesburg Yellow Jackets. He earned NAIA All-American and NAIA All-District honors. He was also a Pennsylvania All-State West Penn Conference selection. Righetti set a record with eighteen individual tackles in a game against the Muskingum Fighting Muskies. He also participated in wrestling and track, placing fourth in the 1966 and 1967 NAIA National Wrestling Tournament and set the school record in the shot put. He was inducted into the Waynesburg College Sports Hall of Fame for both football and wrestling.

Professional career

Cleveland Browns
Righetti was selected by the Cleveland Browns with the 150th pick in the 1969 NFL Draft. He appeared in 23 games for the Browns from 1969 to 1970 before injuries shortened his career.

Personal life
Righetti coached high school football for nine years after his playing career and was also a teacher at Whippany Park High School in New Jersey.

References

External links
Just Sports Stats

1947 births
Living people
American football defensive tackles
Cleveland Browns players
Waynesburg Yellow Jackets football players
High school football coaches in New Jersey
People from Washington County, Pennsylvania
Players of American football from Pennsylvania